The following are the Pulitzer Prizes for 1943.

Journalism awards

Public Service:
The Omaha World-Herald, "for its initiative and originality in planning a statewide campaign for the collection of scrap metal for the war effort. The Nebraska plan was adopted on a national scale by the daily newspapers, resulting in a united effort which succeeded in supplying war industries with necessary scrap material."
Reporting:
George Weller of the Chicago Daily News for "Doc" Lipes Commandeers a Submarine Officers' Wardroom", "his graphic story of how a U.S. Navy Pharmacist's Mate under enemy waters in a submarine performed an operation for appendicitis saving a sailor's life".
Correspondence:
Hanson W. Baldwin of The New York Times, "for his report of his wartime tour of the Southwest Pacific".
Telegraphic Reporting (National):
No award
Telegraphic Reporting (International):
Ira Wolfert of the North American Newspaper Alliance, "for his series of three articles on the fifth battle of the Solomons".
Editorial Writing:
Forrest W. Seymour of the Register and Tribune (Des Moines, Iowa), "for his editorials published during the calendar year 1942".
Editorial Cartooning:
Jay Norwood Darling of the Register and Tribune (Des Moines, Iowa), for "What a Place For a Waste Paper Salvage Campaign".
Photography:
Frank Noel of the Associated Press, for his photo entitled, "Water!"

Letters, Drama and Music Awards
Novel:
Dragon's Teeth by Upton Sinclair (Viking)
Drama:
The Skin of Our Teeth by Thornton Wilder (Harper)
History:
Paul Revere and the World He Lived In by Esther Forbes (Houghton)
Biography or Autobiography:
Admiral of the Ocean Sea by Samuel Eliot Morison (Little)
Poetry:
A Witness Tree by Robert Frost (Holt)
Music:
Secular Cantata No. 2: A Free Song by William Schuman Performed by the Boston Symphony Orchestra and published by G. Schirmer, Inc., New York

References

External links
Pulitzer Prizes for 1943

Pulitzer Prizes by year
Pulitzer Prize
Pulitzer Prize